Atrichochira is a genus of flies belonging to the family Bombyliidae (bee-flies). There are four described species, two from Southern Africa and two from western Australia.

Species
Atrichochira commoni Lambkin & Yeates, 2003
Atrichochira inermis (Bezzi, 1912)
Atrichochira paramonovi Lambkin & Yeates, 2003
Atrichochira pediformis (Bezzi, 1921)

References

Bombyliidae
Diptera of Africa
Diptera of Australasia
Bombyliidae genera